Andreas Michl (born 29 January 1980) is an Austrian football goalkeeper who plays for SK Schärding. Michl previously played for SC Rheindorf Altach in the Austrian Football Bundesliga.

References

1980 births
Living people
Austrian footballers
Austrian expatriate footballers
SV Ried players
SV Wacker Burghausen players
SC Rheindorf Altach players
FC Juniors OÖ players
SKU Amstetten players
Union St. Florian players
ATSV Stadl-Paura players
3. Liga players
Association football goalkeepers
Expatriate footballers in Germany
Austrian expatriate sportspeople in Germany
Austrian Regionalliga players
SK Schärding players